Malysheva is the name of several inhabited localities in Russia.

Modern localities
Urban localities
Malysheva, Sverdlovsk Oblast, a work settlement under the administrative jurisdiction of the Town of Asbest in Sverdlovsk Oblast

Rural localities
Malysheva, Kurgan Oblast, a selo in Bakharevsky Selsoviet of Kargapolsky District of Kurgan Oblast

Renamed localities
Malysheva, until April 2013, name of the selo of Malyshevo in Malyshevsky Selsoviet of Almenevsky District of Kurgan Oblast

Surname
People with Malysheva as a surname:
 Ekaterina Malysheva, Russian designer and Hanoverian princess by marriage
 Yekaterina Malysheva, Russian speed skater